Management science (or managerial science) is a wide and interdisciplinary study of solving complex problems and making strategic decisions as it pertains to institutions, corporations, governments and other types of organizational entities. It is closely related to management, economics, business, engineering, management consulting, and other fields. It uses various scientific research-based principles, strategies, and analytical methods including  mathematical modeling, statistics and numerical algorithms and aims to improve an organization's ability to enact rational and accurate management decisions by arriving at optimal or near optimal solutions to complex decision problems.

Management science looks to help businesses achieve goals using a number of scientific methods. The field was initially an outgrowth of applied mathematics, where early challenges were problems relating to the optimization of systems which could be modeled linearly, i.e., determining the optima (maximum value of profit, assembly line performance, crop yield, bandwidth, etc. or minimum of loss, risk, costs, etc.) of some objective function. Today, management science encompasses any organizational activity for which a problem is structured in mathematical form to generate managerially relevant insights.

Overview 
Management science is concerned with a number of areas of study:  
 Developing and applying models and concepts that may prove useful in helping to illuminate management issues and solve managerial problems. The models used can often be represented mathematically, but sometimes computer-based, visual or verbal representations are used as well or instead. 
 Designing and developing new and better models of organizational excellence.
 Helping to improve, stabilize or otherwise manage profit margins in enterprises.

Management science research can be done on three levels:
 The fundamental level lies in three mathematical disciplines: probability, optimization, and dynamical systems theory.
 The modeling level is about building models, analyzing them mathematically, gathering and analyzing data, implementing models on computers, solving them, experimenting with them—all this is part of management science research on the modeling level. This level is mainly instrumental, and driven mainly by statistics and econometrics. 
 The application level, just as in any other engineering and economics disciplines, strives to make a practical impact and be a driver for change in the real world.

The management scientist's mandate is to use rational, systematic, science-based techniques to inform and improve decisions of all kinds. The techniques of management science are not restricted to business applications but may be applied to military, medical, public administration, charitable groups, political groups or community groups.

History 
The origins of management science can be traced to operations research, which became influential during World War II when the Allied forces recruited scientists of various disciplines to assist with military operations. In these early applications, the scientists used simple mathematical models to make efficient use of limited technologies and resources. The application of these models to the corporate sector became known as management science.

In 1967 Stafford Beer characterized the field of management science as "the business use of operations research".

Theory 
Some of the fields that management science involves include:  

 Data mining
 Decision analysis 
 Engineering
 Forecasting 
 Marketing
 Finance
 Operations
 Game theory
 Industrial engineering
 Logistics
 Management consulting 
 Mathematical modeling
 Optimization
 Operational research
 Probability and statistics
 Project management
 Psychology
 Simulation
 Social network / Transportation forecasting models
 Sociology
 Supply chain management

Applications 

Applications of management science are abundant in industries such as airlines, manufacturing companies, service organizations, military branches, and in government. Management science has contributed insights and solutions to a vast range of problems and issues, including:
 scheduling airlines, both planes and crew 
 deciding the appropriate place to site new facilities such as a warehouse or factory 
 managing the flow of water from reservoirs 
 identifying possible future development paths for parts of the telecommunications industry 
 establishing the information needs of health services and appropriate systems to supply them 
 identifying and understanding the strategies adopted by companies for their information systems

Management science  is also concerned with so-called soft-operational analysis, which concerns methods for strategic planning, strategic decision support, and problem structuring methods (PSM). At this level of abstraction, mathematical modeling and simulation will not suffice. Therefore, since the late 20th century, new non-quantified modelling methods have been developed, including morphological analysis and various forms of influence diagrams.

See also 

 Fayolism
 Institute for Operations Research and the Management Sciences
 John von Neumann Theory Prize
 Managerial economics
 Management engineering
 Management cybernetics
 Innovation management
 Organization studies

References

Further reading 
 Kenneth R. Baker, Dean H. Kropp (1985). Management Science: An Introduction to the Use of Decision Models
 David Charles Heinze (1982). Management Science: Introductory Concepts and Applications
 Lee J. Krajewski, Howard E. Thompson (1981). "Management Science: Quantitative Methods in Context"
 Thomas W. Knowles (1989). Management science: Building and Using Models
 Kamlesh Mathur, Daniel Solow (1994). Management Science: The Art of Decision Making
 Laurence J. Moore, Sang M. Lee, Bernard W. Taylor (1993). Management Science
 William Thomas Morris (1968). Management Science: A Bayesian Introduction.
 William E. Pinney, Donald B. McWilliams (1987). Management Science: An Introduction to Quantitative Analysis for Management
 Gerald E. Thompson (1982). ''Management Science: An Introduction to Modern Quantitative Analysis and Decision Making. New York : McGraw-Hill Publishing Co.

 
Operations research
Behavioural sciences